The Billboard Top Latin albums chart, published in Billboard magazine, is a record chart that features Latin music sales information. This data are compiled by Nielsen SoundScan from a sample that includes music stores, music departments at electronics and department stores, internet sales (both physical and via digital downloads) and verifiable sales from concert venues in United States.

There were fifteen number-one albums in 2002, including Libre by Marc Anthony, which received a nomination for Best Salsa album at the Latin Grammy Awards of 2002, and MTV Unplugged by Alejandro Sanz—the winner of the Latin Grammy Award for Album of the Year. Spanish singer-songwriter Enrique Iglesias peaked at number one for the fifth time on this chart with Quizás, while Colombian performer Shakira, Mexican norteño band Los Tigres del Norte, and rock band Maná released their third chart topper, respectively. Los Temerarios became the fourth act to release two number-one albums in the same year, after Selena, Enrique Iglesias and Grupo Bryndis. Intocable, Chayanne, Thalía, Las Ketchup, Banda el Recodo and Luis Fonsi peaked at number one for the first time.

One compilation album hit the top of this chart in 2002, Las 30 Cumbias Más Pegadas, which includes performances by Angeles Azules, Grupo Carabo, Los Askis, Rayito Colombiano, Chon Arauza y La Furia Colombiana, Aaron y Su Grupo Illusion, Grupo Perla Colombiana and Tropa Vallenata.

Albums

References

2002 Latin
United States Latin Albums
2002 in Latin music